Alive and Kickin' Ass is the fifth live album released by Crack the Sky. Recorded live at the Tower Theater in Philadelphia, Pennsylvania and the Agora in Cleveland, Ohio in 1978—the same shows that were used for the Live Sky album. Four of these performances were previously unreleased and six were on Live Sky (one of those six, "She's a Dancer", was edited for length on Live Sky but appears here in its entirety); the tapes were Produced, remixed and remastered by bassist Joe Macre for this release.

Track listing

Personnel
Rick Witkowski – Lead guitar
Joe Macre – Bass guitar, harmonies
Jim Griffiths – Lead guitar, harmonies
Joey D'Amico – Drums, harmonies
Vince DePaul – Keyboards
Gary Lee Chappell – Lead vocals

Crack the Sky live albums
2006 live albums